Moody Air Force Base (AFB)  is a United States Air Force installation near Valdosta, Georgia.

Geography
The base is in northeastern Lowndes County, Georgia, with the eastern border of the base following the Lanier County line. Georgia State Route 125 runs through the western side of the base, leading southwest  to the center of Valdosta and northeast  to Ray City.

The entire Air Force base is counted as a census-designated place for statistical purposes.

History
The 29th Training Wing was established at Moody Field in 1941 for primary flight training. Initially called Valdosta Airfield in June 1941, it was renamed Moody Army Air Field on 6 December 1941. The installation's namesake, Maj. George Moody (1908–1941), was an Air Corps test pilot who died on 5 May 1941 in a crash of the prototype Beech Model 25 twin-engine trainer aircraft on its first test flight in Wichita, Kansas. The Model 25 eventually became the AT-10 "Wichita", flown extensively at Moody Field during WWII.

On 1 May 1945 Moody was transferred to the First Air Force. On 1 November 1945 Moody was transferred to Army Air Forces Training Command. On 1 September 1947 Moody was transferred to Tactical Air Command. On 13 January 1948 the base was redesignated Moody Air Force Base. On 1 December 1948 the base was transferred to Continental Air Command. On 1 April 1951 Moody AFB was transferred to Strategic Air Command (SAC).

Air Training Command (1951–75)
On 1 September 1951 Moody AFB was transferred from SAC to Air Training Command and the 3550th Training Wing (Interceptor Aircrew) was established there. In 1952 Moody was assigned to undertake combat crew training. In July 1957, following the cessation of interceptor training at Tyndall Air Force Base, advanced interceptor training and Tyndall's F-86D Sabres were transferred to Moody, while Moody's F-89Ds were transferred to James Connally Air Force Base. On 3 November 1960 Moody stopped interceptor training and became a consolidated pilot training school.

In 1961 following the closure of Graham Air Base, Moody became responsible for foreign pilot training. From 1962 onwards, increasing numbers of Republic of Vietnam Air Force pilots were trained on Moody's 30 T-28 Trojans. In 1963 foreign pilot training was moved to Randolph Air Force Base.

On 1 December 1973 the 3550th Training Wing was inactivated and replaced by the new 38th Flying Training Wing.

On 1 December 1975 Moody AFB was transferred from Air Training Command to Tactical Air Command and the 38th Flying Training Wing was inactivated.

Tactical Air Command (1975–1992)
On 30 September 1975 the 347th Tactical Fighter Wing moved to Moody AFB from Korat Royal Thai Air Force Base.

On 1 October 1991 the 347th Tactical Fighter Wing was redesignated the 347th Fighter Wing.

Air Combat Command (1992–2003)
On 1 July 1994 was redesignated the 347th Wing, a composite wing with fighter, close air support and airlift elements.

On 1 April 1997 the 41st Rescue Squadron and the 71st Rescue Squadron moved to Moody from Patrick Air Force Base and the 23d Wing was assigned to the 347th Wing.

On 30 June 2000 the 70th Fighter Squadron was inactivated at Moody. On 2 February 2001 the 69th Fighter Squadron was inactivated at Moody. On 30 April 2001 the 68th Fighter Squadron was inactivated at Moody.

On 1 May 2001 the 38th Rescue Squadron was activated at Moody and the 347th Wing was redesignated the 347th Rescue Wing.

Air Education and Training Command (2000–07)
On 31 July 2000 the 479th Flying Training Group was reactivated at Moody to conduct primary Specialized Undergraduate Pilot Training and Introduction to Fighter Fundamentals training. On 2 April 2001 the 39th Flying Training Squadron was activated at Moody and it was joined by the 3d Flying Training Squadron. On 1 October 2001 the 435th Flying Training Squadron also moved to Moody.

On 21 July 2007 the 479th Flying Training Group was inactivated and its aircraft and equipment were redistributed to other AETC units.

Air Force Special Operations Command (2003–06)
On 1 October 2003 the 347th Rescue Wing was assigned to Air Force Special Operations Command.

Air Combat Command (2006–present)
On 1 October 2006 the 23rd Fighter Group was redesignated as the 23d Wing and activated at Moody AFB. On the same date the 347th Rescue Wing was inactivated and the 347th Operations Group was redesignated the 347th Rescue Group which became a subordinate element of the 23d Wing.

The 23rd Wing inactivated the 23rd Aircraft Maintenance Squadron in January 2022 while at the same time activating the 74th and 75th Fighter Generation Squadrons. The move was part of Air Combat Command's plans to improve the alignment of fighter operations and maintenance.

Based units 
Flying and notable non-flying units based at Moody Air Force Base.

Units marked GSU are Geographically Separate Units, which although based at Moody, are subordinate to a parent unit based at another location.

United States Air Force 

Air Combat Command (ACC)
 Fifteenth Air Force
 23rd Wing
 23rd Fighter Group
 74th Fighter Squadron – A-10C Thunderbolt II
 75th Fighter Squadron – A-10C Thunderbolt II
 23rd Operations Support Squadron
 23rd Maintenance Group
 23rd Maintenance Squadron
 23rd Maintenance Operations Flight
 74th Fighter Generation Squadron
 75th Fighter Generation Squadron
 563rd Maintenance Squadron
 71st Rescue Generation Squadron
 763rd Maintenance Squadron
 23rd Medical Group
 23rd Aerospace Medicine Squadron
 23rd Medical Operations Squadron
 23rd Medical Support Squadron
 23rd Mission Support Group
 23rd Civil Engineer Squadron
 23rd Communications Squadron
 23rd Contracting Squadron
 23rd Force Support Squadron
 23rd Logistics Readiness Squadron
 23rd Security Forces Squadron
 347th Rescue Group
 38th Rescue Squadron
 41st Rescue Squadron – HH-60G Pave Hawk
 71st Rescue Squadron – HC-130J Combat King II
 347th Operations Support Squadron
 93d Air Ground Operations Wing
 820th Base Defense Group
 820th Combat Operations Squadron
 822d Base Defense Squadron
 823d Base Defense Squadron
 824th Base Defense Squadron

Air Force Reserve Command (AFRC)
 Tenth Air Force
 442nd Fighter Wing
 476th Fighter Group (GSU)
 76th Fighter Squadron – A-10C Thunderbolt II
 476th Aerospace Medical Flight
 476th Maintenance Squadron

Air Education and Training Command (AETC)
 Nineteenth Air Force
 14th Flying Training Wing
 14th Operations Group
 81st Fighter Squadron (GSU) – A-29 Super Tucano

References

External links 

 Moody Air Force Base official website

Installations of the United States Air Force in Georgia (U.S. state)
Military installations established in 1948